Pseudecheneis paucipunctatus is a species of sisorid catfish found in the Upper Nujiang Salween River drainage in Yunnan, China.

References

Catfish of Asia
Taxa named by Zhou Wei (zoologist) 
Taxa named by Li Xu (zoologist)
Taxa named by Yang Ying (zoologist)
Fish described in 2008
Sisoridae